Estádio José Alvalade was a multi-purpose stadium in Lisbon, Portugal. The stadium was able to hold 52,411 people. It was inaugurated on 10 June 1956.

Home venue of Sporting CP for 47 years, it was mostly used for football matches, but also athletics. It was named after Sporting founder José Alfredo Holtreman Roquette, known as José Alvalade after his family. José Alvalade borrowed money from his grandfather, the Viscount of Alvalade, in order to fund Sporting.

It was closed in 2003, when the new Estádio José Alvalade opened.

Concerts 
During the 1990s, Estadio José Alvalade was one of the most prominent venue for rock concerts in Portugal, hosting tour dates of many high-profile international artists, including among many others, rock band Bon Jovi, Depeche Mode, U2, R.E.M., David Bowie, Dire Straits, Pink Floyd and Genesis. This era was inaugurated on June 29, 1989 with a concert by The Cure, during their Prayer Tour promoting the album Disintegration.

Tina Turner performed on September 29, 1990 and September 22, 1996. Dire Straits performed on May 16, 1992, on the On Every Street Tour. 
Michael Jackson performed on September 26, 1992, to a sold-out crowd of 55 000 people. Guns N' Roses performed on July 2, 1992, again to a sold-out crowd. Bruce Springsteen played to an overpacked stadium of 60 000 People in 1993. That is still the Stadium record for attendance.

Portugal national football team
The national team first played in the stadium in 1957 and had its last game in 2002.

References

Sporting CP
Jose Alvalade
Multi-purpose stadiums in Portugal
Sports venues completed in 1956
Sports venues demolished in 2003
Athletics (track and field) venues in Portugal